The 2022 FIBA Europe Cup Finals were the concluding games of the 2021–22 FIBA Europe Cup season. The Finals were played in a two-legged format, with the first leg being played on April 20 and the second one on 27 April 2022. The finals were played between Bahçeşehir Koleji and UnaHotels Reggio Emilia. Both teams were appear in their first FIBA Europe Cup final, as well as their first European final.

Bahçeşehir won its first European championship after defeating Reggiana in both legs. The second leg was attended by 13,485 spectators, setting a new FIBA Europe Cup record. Jamar Smith won the league's Finals MVP award.

Venue

Road to the Finals

Note: In the table, the score of the finalist is given first (H = home; A = away).

First leg

Second leg

References

External links

See also
2022 EuroLeague Final Four
2022 EuroCup Finals
2022 Basketball Champions League Final Four

2022
2021–22 FIBA Europe Cup
FIBA Europe Cup Finals
FIBA Europe Cup Finals
2021–22 in Italian basketball
2021–22 in Turkish basketball
Sport in Istanbul
Reggio Emilia
International basketball competitions hosted by Italy
International basketball competitions hosted by Turkey